"Tomodachi no Uta" is the single by Japanese singer Ataru Nakamura for her first studio album, "Ten made Todoke" (2007). It was written by Nakamura herself and Kiyohide Ura.

Chart performance
After its major release from avex, "Tomodachi no Uta" debuted on the Japan Oricon Weekly Singles chart at number 150, and peaked at number 9 in its fifth week. This song sold over 100,000 physical copies and over 250,000 digital copies so far.

Live performance
She performed this song in 58th NHK Kōhaku Uta Gassen, the most popular music TV program in Japan.

Covers
In 2006, Japanese famous female singer Hiromi Iwasaki covered this song in her album "Natural".

Track listing

Charts and certifications

Weekly Charts

Certifications

References

External links
Ataru Nakamura Official Website

2006 singles
2005 songs
Avex Trax singles